Osei Telesford (born November 30, 1983) is a Trinidadian footballer who plays for the Criollos de Caguas FC in the Liga Puerto Rico.

Career

Youth and College
Born in San Juan, Telesford was a member of the youth setup at famed Trinidadian club Joe Public, before coming to the United States in 2003. He played college soccer at Liberty University, starting 65 of 66 matches from 2003 to 2006, scoring 8 goals and assisting on 8 more. He was named to the All Big South Conference Team in each of his four years with the team.

During his college years he also played for Carolina Dynamo of the USL Premier Development League. He was PDL Defender of the Year in 2006, and was a PDL First Team selection for helping Dynamo to a league-best 14-0-2 regular season record

Professional
Telesford was drafted in the 2nd round (21st overall) by Chicago Fire in the 2007 MLS Supplemental Draft, but played 2 Major League Soccer games for the team before being released at the end of the year.

He signed with the Puerto Rico Islanders in the USL First Division in early 2008, and helped the Islanders win the 2008 USL First Division regular season title and progressed to the semi finals of the CONCACAF Champions League 2008–09.

International
Telesford earned his first cap for the Trinidad and Tobago national football team in January 2007 during the Caribbean Digicel Cup. He was previously a regular fixture on the U-23 and U-20 levels.

Honors
Puerto Rico Islanders
USSF Division 2 Pro League: 2010
Commissioner's Cup: 2008
CFU Club Championship: 2010

References

External links
 
 Puerto Rico Islanders bio
 MLS player profile

1983 births
Living people
North Carolina Fusion U23 players
Chicago Fire FC players
Expatriate footballers in Puerto Rico
Expatriate soccer players in the United States
Liberty Flames men's soccer players
Puerto Rico Islanders players
Trinidad and Tobago footballers
Trinidad and Tobago international footballers
USL First Division players
USL League Two players
Trinidad and Tobago expatriate sportspeople in Puerto Rico
USSF Division 2 Professional League players
North American Soccer League players
Major League Soccer players
Chicago Fire FC draft picks
Association football midfielders
Trinidad and Tobago expatriate sportspeople in the United States